Benny Douglas (born July 22, 1971), professionally known as Benny Boom, is an American director who has worked in music, television, and film. His most commercially successful film was the 2017 Tupac Shakur biopic All Eyez on Me.

Career
Douglas was raised in West Philadelphia and then Mount Airy. He studied film at Temple University before moving to New York City, where he briefly collaborated with the hip hop duo Channel Live and adopted his nickname from that of boxer Ray "Boom Boom" Mancini. After working as a security guard on the set of the 1995 Spike Lee film Clockers, Douglas was hired in an assistant role for music video directors Hype Williams, Director X, and Paul Hunter.

Starting in the 2000s, Douglas helmed videos for artists such as Nicki Minaj, Sean Combs, Keyshia Cole, Akon and 50 Cent. For his efforts, he was awarded B.E.T.’s Video Director of the Year in 2009 and 2013. He also helmed commercial spots for Jeep, Honda, Gatorade, Sears and others. In 2009, Douglas made his feature film debut with the comedy, Next Day Air, starring Mike Epps, Omari Hardwick and Mos Def. His second film, the action drama S.W.A.T.: Firefight was released in 2011. His third film, All Eyez on Me, a biopic about rapper and actor Tupac Shakur, was released in June 2017.

Douglas made his television directorial debut in 2013, with an episode of 90210 (Season 5) for the CW Network, followed by the entire Season 2 of Knock Out, a reality boxing show, for FuseTV in 2015. He continued to make waves in 2016 with episodes of hit dramas NCIS: Los Angeles and Empire, starring Taraji P. Henson and Terrence Howard. In 2019, Douglas became the director for the second season of The CW show, All American.

Douglas is represented by ICM Partners for television and film.

Filmography

Films
 Next Day Air (2009)
 S.W.A.T.: Firefight 
 All Eyez on Me

Television
 Access Granted (2003–2008)
 90210 (2013)
 NCIS: Los Angeles (2016–2020)
 Empire (2017)
 Tales (2017)
 Black Lightning (2018–2020)
 The Quad (2018)
 All American (2018–2022)
 Ambitions (2019)
 Council of Dads (2020)
 CSI: Vegas (2021–2022)
 Queens (2021)
 The Equalizer (2021–2022)
 Our Kind of People (2021)
Magnum P.I. (2022-23)
All American: Homecoming (2022)

Music videos

50 Cent
 Just a Lil Bit (2005)
 Window Shopper (2005)
 Best Friend (Remix) (2006)
 Amusement Park (2007)
 Straight to the Bank (2007)
Akon
Smack That (2006/ft. Eminem)
I Wanna Love You (2006/ft. Snoop Dogg)
Amerie
Why Don't We Fall In Love (2002)
Avant Read Your Mind
Lie About Us (2006/ft. Nicole Scherzinger) 
Benzino
Shine Like My Son (2001)
Birdman
What Happened to That Boy (2002/ft. Clipse)
Stuntin' Like My Daddy (2006/ft. Lil Wayne)
Pop Bottles (2007/ft. Lil Wayne)
BoA
Jazzclub MV
B.o.B
Out of My Mind (2012/ft. Nicki Minaj)
Bow Wow
Fresh Azimiz (2005)
Fresh Azimiz (Remix) (2005/ft. Mike Jones)
Busta Rhymes
Touch It (2006)
Touch It (Remix) (2006/ft. Mary J. Blige, Rah Digga, Missy Elliott, Lloyd Banks, Papoose and DMX)
I Love My Chick (2006/ft. Kelis and will.i.am)
New York Shit (2006/ft. Swizz Beatz) (co-directed by Justin Francis)
C-Side
Boyfriend/Girlfriend (2008/ft. Keyshia Cole)
Cassidy
I'm A Hustla (2005)
Channel Live
Wild Out 2K (2000)
Cherish
Do It to It (2006/ft. Sean Paul of YoungBloodZ)
Amnesia (2008)
Ciara
Goodies (2004/ft. Petey Pablo)
1, 2 Step (2004/ft. Missy Elliott)
Dappy
No Regrets (2011)
David Guetta
 Light My Body Up (2017/ft. Nicki Minaj and Lil Wayne)
DJ Drama
We in This Bitch (2012)
Fantasia
I'm Doin' Me (2010)
G. Dep
Everyday (2001)
Special Delivery (rmx) (2002) f/ P. Diddy, Ghostface Killah, Craig Mack and Keith Murray
Ja Rule
Clap Back/ The Crown (2003)
Jacquees
At the Club (2018)
Jazmine Sullivan
10 Seconds (2010)
Jibbs
Chain Hang Low (2006)
JoJo
Disaster (2011)
K. Michelle
V.S.O.P. (2013)
Katerina Graham
Put Your Graffiti on Me (2012)
Wanna Say (2013)
Kelly Rowland
Can't Nobody (2003)
Keyshia Cole
(I Just Want It) to Be Over (2005)
I Should Have Cheated (2005)
Love (2006)
Let It Go (/ft. Lil' Kim and Missy Elliott) (2007)
I Remember (2007)
Heaven Sent (2008)
Playa Cardz Right (2008)
You Complete Me (2009)
Trust (2009)
I Ain't Thru (/ft. Nicki Minaj) (2010)
Long Way Down (2010)
Enough of No Love (/ft. Lil Wayne) (2012)
Trust and Believe (2012)
You (/ft. Remy Ma and French Montana) (2017)
Kirko Bangz
Keep it Trill (2012)
Lil' Kim
The Jump Off (2003/ft. Mr. Cheeks)
Lil' Mo
4Ever (2003/ft. Fabolous)
Lil Wayne
Shooter (2006/w. Robin Thicke)
Hustler Musik / Money On My Mind (2007)
LL Cool J 
Luv U Better (2002)
Paradise (2003/ft. Amerie)
Baby (2008/ft. The-Dream)
Lyfe Jennings
S.E.X. (2006/ft La La Brown)
Mario
How Could You (2005)
Boom (2005/ft. Juvenile)
Mase
Breathe, Stretch, Shake (2004/ft. P. Diddy)
Meek Mill
Ima Boss (2011/ft. Rick Ross)
 All Eyes on You (2015/ft. Nicki Minaj and Chris Brown) 
Mobb Deep
Got It Twisted (2004)
Real Gangstaz (2004/ft. Lil Jon) 
Monica
U Should've Known Better (2004)
Mýa
Lock U Down (2007/ft. Lil Wayne)
Nas
Oochie Wally (2001/ft. Bravehearts)
Got Ur Self A... (2001)
Made You Look (2002)
Nelly
Dilemma (2002/w. Kelly Rowland)
Shake Ya Tailfeather (2003/ft. P Diddy and Murphy Lee)
Errtime (2005)
Stepped On My J's (2008/ft. Ciara and Jermaine Dupri)
Body on Me (2008/ft. Akon and Ashanti)
New Kids on the Block
Single (2008/ft. Ne-Yo)
Nicki Minaj
Beez in the Trap (2012/ft. 2 Chainz)
Right By My Side (2012/ft.Chris Brown)
Pound the Alarm (2012)
High School (2013/ft. Lil Wayne)
No Frauds (2017/ft. Drake & Lil Wayne)
Do We Have A Problem ? (2021/ft Lil Baby)
P Diddy
I Need a Girl Pt. 1 (2002/ft. Usher and Loon)
I Need a Girl Pt. 2 (2002/ft. Ginuwine, Loon and Mario Winans)
Prince Royce
Te Robaré (2013)
Sean Kingston
Seasonal Love (2013/ft. Wale)
Sean Paul
Like Glue (2003)
Sheek Louch
Mighty D-Block (2 Guns Up) (2003/ft. Jadakiss)
P$C
I'm A King (2005/ft. Lil' Scrappy)
Pussycat Dolls
Beep (2006/ft. will.i.am)
R. Kelly
I'm A Flirt (Remix) (2007/ft. T.I. and T-Pain)
Robin Thicke
Shooter (2006/w. Lil Wayne)
Lost Without U (2006)
Can U Believe (2006)
Rooney
When Did Your Heart Go Missing? (2007)
Sean Paul
Like Glue (2003)
Shyne
Jimmy Choo (2004/ft. Ashanti)
Snoop Dogg
That's That (2006/ft. R. Kelly)
Swizz Beatz 
Bigger Business (2002/ft. P. Diddy, Ronald Isley, Baby, Jadakiss, Cassidy and Snoop Dogg)
T-Pain
Buy U a Drank (Shawty Snappin')(2007/ft. Yung Joc)
Teairra Mari
Hunt 4 U (2008/ft. Pleasure P)
Tink
Million (2015)
Trey Songz
Heart Attack (2012)
2 Reasons (featuring T.I.) (2012)
Tristan Wilds
Love in the 90z (2016)
Waka Flocka Flame
Hard in Da Paint (2010)
Get Low (2012/ft. Nicki Minaj, Tyga and Flo Rida) 
Wale
Clappers (2013/ft. Juicy J and Nicki Minaj)
Youngbloodz
Damn! (2003/ft. Lil Jon)

Live DVDs
 Pussycat Dolls: Live from London
 With Chris Applebaum (2006)

References

External links

1971 births
African-American film directors
American film directors
American music video directors
Living people
Place of birth missing (living people)
21st-century African-American people
20th-century African-American people